Henrique Gomes de Paiva Lins de Barros (Rio de Janeiro, May 30, 1947) is a Brazilian physicist, biophysicist, writer, science communicator, musician, screenwriter, painter and poet.

Early years
His parents were Henry British (Navy official) and Eurydice Gomes de Paiva Lins de Barros. His father and uncles played a part in the creation of the CBPF, together with César Lattes, one of the founding members and friend of Lins de Barros family. He was raised in Copacabana, where he developed his interest about airplanes when, together with his brothers, he learned to recognize the noise from the machines, since he lived in a apartment "where we almost couldn't see the sky".

Career

In 1964, Henrique started the engineering course in the Fluminense Federal University, changing after 18 months for a graduation in physics in PUC-RJ in 1970 and during this time he started, as a hobby, to create music. There, he received the diploma as master in atomic theory in 1973, where he also worked as a teacher.

In the CBPF he works in the subject of biophysics, where a joint investigation with UFRJ ended in the discovery of a multicellular bacterium.

He's interested about atomic physics, biophysics, history of science, history of tecnics and consider himself as an experimental researcher, instead of a theorist.

Science communication
He started as a science communicator during the Brazilian military dictatorship during the 80s and also participated in conferences. Since he couldn't conciliate his work with his science communication efforts, he had to give up his productivity scholarship.

Santos-Dumont
He is considered the biggest expert in the live and work of Alberto Santos Dumont, having written four books about the Brazilian and is considered reference in Brazil and the rest of the world. His interest about this character started in the 80s, when he saw a replica of the 1909 Demoiselle, and started researching about the Dumont and his plane, with the goal to create a small scale replica for himself. He also challenges the idea that the Wright Brothers invented the airplane and agrees that this controversy in the country is a failure from the Brazilian science communication. According to him, there are a political pressure to talk about the Wright's and happened a clear campaign in the end of 1930s in for the Americans, despise it "doesn't have any historical basis", due the fact that the brothers never had "understood what is to takeoff", according to the researcher.

With CNPJ investment, in 1985, he went to France to research about Santos Dumont thanks to a movie project from Tizuka Yamasaki and thanks all the data re compiled, in 1986 he wrote his first book, "Santos-Dumont". The movie was ultimately scrapped due budget constrains, but he was the screenwriter and composer of  documentary, "O homem pode voar" (2003).

In 2005, he participated in the construction of a 14-bis replica by Alan Calassa. In 2014 he took office as chief from the Museum of Environment.

Awards
Thanks his research about Santos Dumont, Henrique Lins the Barros was awarded with Order of Aeronautical Merit as Grand-Officer
on October 23, 2007. He also received the Santos-Dumont Merit Medal, National Order of Scientific Merit and the Medalha 20 anos da Ciência Hoje.

Works
Partial listing:

BARROS, Henrique Gomes de Paiva Lins de. Santos Dumont: o homem voa! Rio de Janeiro: Contraponto, 2000.

__. Santos Dumont e a invenção do vôo. Rio de Janeiro: Jorge Zahar Editor, 2003.

__. Desafio de voar. São Paulo: Metalivros, 2006.

Translations

References

External links
Curriculum Lattes

1947 births
Brazilian physicists
Alberto Santos-Dumont
Brazilian biographers
Biophysicists
Academic staff of the Pontifical Catholic University of Rio de Janeiro
Pontifical Catholic University of Rio de Janeiro alumni
Fluminense Federal University alumni
Writers from Rio de Janeiro (city)
Brazilian science writers
Brazilian film score composers
Brazilian screenwriters
Brazilian painters
Brazilian male poets
Living people
Male biographers